Antwain Smith (born May 1, 1975) is an American professional basketball player in the small forward position. He attended Saint Paul's College from 1995 to 1999.

Upon college graduation, Smith was selected with the 51st pick of the 1999 NBA Draft by the Vancouver Grizzlies, but never played a game with any NBA team. He went on to play in the IBL with St. Louis Swarm (1999-00, 2000–01) and Richmond Rhythm (2000–01) and the NBDL, for the Fayetteville Patriots (2001–02, started that season in Slovenia).

References

External links
College stats at sportsstats.com

1975 births
Living people
American expatriate basketball people in Slovenia
American men's basketball players
Basketball players from Virginia
Fayetteville Patriots players
KK Krka players
Richmond Rhythm players
Saint Paul's Tigers men's basketball players
Small forwards
Sportspeople from Newport News, Virginia
St. Louis Swarm players
Vancouver Grizzlies draft picks